Laacher See, also known as Lake Laach or Laach Lake, is a volcanic caldera lake with a diameter of  in Rhineland-Palatinate, Germany, about  northwest of Koblenz,  south of Bonn, and  west of Andernach. It is in the Eifel mountain range, and is part of the East Eifel volcanic field within the larger Volcanic Eifel. The lake was formed by a Plinian eruption approximately 13,000 years BP with a Volcanic Explosivity Index (VEI) of 6, on the same scale as the Pinatubo eruption of 1991.

Description
The lake is oval in shape and surrounded by high banks. The lava was quarried for millstones from the Roman period until the introduction of iron rollers for grinding grain.

On the western side lies the Benedictine Maria Laach Abbey, founded in 1093 by Henry II of Laach of the House of Luxembourg, first Count Palatine of the Rhine, who had his castle opposite to the monastery above the eastern lakeside.

The lake has no natural outlet but is drained by a tunnel dug before 1170 and rebuilt several times since. It is named for Fulbert, abbot of the monastery from 1152–1177, who is believed to have built it.

The eruption
Volcanism in Germany can be traced back for millions of years, related to the development of the European Cenozoic Rift System, which was caused by the collision between the African and Eurasian plates, but it has been concentrated in bursts associated with the loading and unloading of ice during glacial advances and retreats.

The initial blasts of Laacher See, which took place in late spring or early summer, flattened trees up to four kilometres away. The magma opened a route to the surface that erupted for about ten hours, with the plume probably reaching a height of 35 kilometres. Activity continued for several weeks or months, producing pyroclastic currents that covered valleys up to ten kilometres away with sticky tephra. Near the crater, deposits reach over fifty metres in thickness, and even five kilometres away they are still ten metres thick. All plants and animals for a distance of about sixty kilometres to the northeast and forty kilometres to the southeast must have been wiped out. 
This 'huge' Plinian eruption thus had a Volcanic Explosivity Index (VEI) of 6.

Tephra deposits from the eruption dammed the Rhine, creating a  lake. When the dam broke, an outburst flood swept downstream, leaving deposits as far away as Bonn. The fallout has been identified in an area of more than 300,000 square kilometres, stretching from central France to northern Italy and from southern Sweden to Poland, making it an invaluable tool for chronological correlation of archaeological and palaeoenvironmental layers across the area.

Aftermath of the eruption

The wider effects of the eruption were limited, amounting to several years of cold summers and up to two decades of environmental disruption in Germany. However, the lives of the local population, known as the Federmesser culture, were disrupted. Before the eruption, they were a sparsely distributed people who subsisted by foraging and hunting, using both spears and bows and arrows. According to archaeologist Felix Riede, after the eruption the area most affected by the fallout, the Thuringian Basin occupied by the Federmesser, appears to have been largely depopulated, whereas populations in southwest Germany and France increased. Two new cultures, the Bromme of southern Scandinavia and the Perstunian of northeast Europe emerged. These cultures had a lower level of toolmaking skills than the Federmesser, particularly the Bromme who appear to have lost the bow and arrow technology. In Riede's view the decline was a result from the disruption caused by the Laacher See volcano.

The eruption was discussed as a possible cause for the Younger Dryas, a period of global cooling near the end of the last glacial maximum that appeared to coincide with the time of the Laacher See eruption. However, an improved dating of the onset of the Younger Dryas in Europe, published in 2021, showed that it began about 200 years after the eruption, ruling it out as a potential cause.

See also
List of volcanoes in Germany

References

Further reading

External links

Continuous event display of the 10 most recent registered seismic activities measured from the Laacher See

Apokalypse im Rheintal (Cornelia Park und Hans-Ulrich Schmincke)
Martin Hensch, etal.: Deep low-frequency earthquakes reveal ongoing magmatic recharge beneath Laacher See Volcano (Eifel, Germany). Geophys. J. Int. (2019) 216, 2025–2036 doi:10.1093/gji/ggy532
Michael W. Förster, Frank Sirocko: Volcanic activity in the Eifel during the last 500,000 years: The ELSA-Tephra-Stack .Global and Planetary Change (2016) (PDF)

Lakes of Rhineland-Palatinate
Eifel
Volcanoes of Germany
Calderas of Europe
Volcanic crater lakes
VEI-6 volcanoes
Hotspot volcanoes
Potentially active volcanoes
Pleistocene calderas
Dormant volcanoes
Endorheic lakes of Europe